Saleh Ibn Abdul Rahman Hussayen (صالح ابن عبدالرحمن الحصيّن) is a prominent Saudi government official who fell under suspicion following the Sept 11th attacks when it was discovered that three of the hijackers, Hani Hanjour, Khalid Almihdhar, and Nawaf Alhazmi had checked into the Marriott Residence Inn in Herndon, Virginia, the same hotel he was staying at, the night before the attacks.

Throughout much of the 1990s, he acted as director for the SAAR Foundation which has been accused of supplying terrorist groups with illicit funding.

He was questioned by the FBI shortly after the attacks, but reportedly feigned a seizure during the interview and was taken to a nearby hospital where it was reported he was in perfect health.  Since then, no complicity has been proven and it remains murky whether his meeting with the hijackers was coincidental.

On September 19, 2001, once the ban on International flights had been lifted, he was allowed to leave the United States and return to Saudi Arabia. Five months later he joined the Saudi government as President of the Affairs of the Holy Mosques Masjid al-Haram (Grand Mosque) in Mecca and Al-Masjid al-Nabawi (Prophet's Mosque) in Medina.

His nephew, Sami Omar Al-Hussayen, who was a graduate student at the University of Idaho, was arrested on charges of visa fraud, and later conspiring to provide material support to terrorists. He was not found guilty on any of the charges, and was willingly deported back to Saudi Arabia.

References

Living people
Year of birth missing (living people)
Place of birth missing (living people)